Moltena fiara, the strelitzia night-fighter or banana-tree night-fighter, is a butterfly of the family Hesperiidae. It is found in coastal lowland and riverine forest from the East Cape along the KwaZulu-Natal coast to Maputaland and north to Maputo in Mozambique.

The wingspan is 54–57 mm for males and 58–64 mm for females. Adults are on wing from August to October and from February to April. There are two generations per year.

The larvae feed on Strelitzia nicolai, first instars are bright red with a black head, and use silk to form a shelter by sticking leaves together.

References

External links
Image of egg - Steve Woodhall

Butterflies described in 1870
Erionotini
Butterflies of Africa
Taxa named by Arthur Gardiner Butler